Agathobacter is a bacterial genus from the family of Lachnospiraceae.

References

Lachnospiraceae
Bacteria genera